Delayed Reaction is Soul Asylum's 10th full-length studio album and the long-awaited follow-up to their 2006 studio release The Silver Lining. It was released on July 17, 2012, and debuted at #160 on Billboard. It is their first album released on 429 Records.

Reception

Delayed Reaction received positive reviews from critics upon release. On Metacritic, the album holds a score of 72/100 based on 4 reviews, indicating "generally favorable reviews."

Track listing

"By the Way" was originally released in demo form 20 years earlier as a B-Side to the 1992 single "Somebody to Shove"; "Let's All Kill Each Other" was originally released on Saturday, October 25, 2008 on EnterTheSoulAsylum.com as a free download until the 2008 U.S. Election Day (Tuesday, November 4, 2008), and "I Should've Stayed in Bed" was originally released in 1998 on Live at the Palais Royale and "Good Morning, Good Morning" is a cover of The Beatles song from their album Sgt. Pepper's Lonely Hearts Club Band

Band members
 Dave Pirner – lead vocals, rhythm guitar
 Dan Murphy – lead guitar, backing vocals
 Tommy Stinson – bass
 Michael Bland – drums

References

Soul Asylum albums
2012 albums